Kick-Ass 2: The Game is a beat 'em up video game  based on the film Kick-Ass 2. It serves as a sequel to Kick-Ass: The Game. It was developed by Freedom Factory Studios and published by UIG Entertainment. The game was released for Microsoft Windows, PlayStation 3, and Xbox 360.

The game was heavily criticized by critics, for its technical glitches and lack of originality.

Plot 
Kick-Ass 2: The Game is set in New York City. The game takes on a similar plot to the movie it was based on. Taking place three to four years after the death of Damon McCready and stopping Frank D'Amico, The main character, Dave Lizewski, also known as Kick-Ass (Yuri Lowenthal) has retired from superhero and crime-fighting work. However, he quickly becomes bored of having a normal life and begins training with Damon's Daughter, Mindy McCready, also known as Hit Girl (Chloe Grace Moretz). Before Kick Ass can complete his training, however, the son of Frank D'Amico, Chris D'Amico (Matthew Mercer) accidentally kills his mother. He blames Kick Ass for this, and vows to get his revenge. He also replace his superhero name Red Mist and became a super villain named The Motherfucker, and recruit a team named "The Toxic Mega-Cunts", hired some other villains like The Tumor (Andrew Kishino), Genghis Carnage (Eric Bauza), Black Death (Gary Anthony Williams) and Mother Russia (Zelda Williams), and plan to take over New York City. Now Kick-Ass need to help the superhero team "Justice Forever" and must stop Chris and save New York.

Gameplay 
At the beginning of the game, the gameplay is mostly training; however, the game later sees the player go on to fighting enemies and bosses similar to those in the movie. There are 5 bosses in total, throughout all of the levels. The game features a wide variety of weapons for the player's use in fighting enemies and bosses. There are also a large number of combos which can be used against enemies in the game. The controls use two different buttons for attacks.

References

Action video games
Video games based on Marvel Comics films
Kick-Ass (franchise)
Linux games
MacOS games
Beat 'em ups
Windows games
2014 video games
M-Rated Marvel Comics video games
PlayStation 3 games
Superhero video games
Video games developed in Spain
Video games featuring female protagonists
Video games set in New York City
Xbox 360 games